The Hewitson River is a short river in Thunder Bay District, northwestern Ontario, Canada. When the Canadian Pacific Railway was being constructed along the north shore of Lake Superior 1882–1885, the river was known as Maggot River.

Course
The river begins at Whitesand Lake and flows over a series of falls, called the Rainbow Falls, then is crossed by Highway 17, and finally flows into Lake Superior.

Economy
Several campgrounds of Rainbow Falls Provincial Park lie astride the river.

See also
List of rivers of Ontario

References

Rivers of Thunder Bay District
Tributaries of Lake Superior